Cercyon herceus is a species of water scavenger beetle in the family Hydrophilidae. It is found in North America.

Subspecies
These two subspecies belong to the species Cercyon herceus:
 Cercyon herceus frigidus Smetana, 1978
 Cercyon herceus herceus Smetana, 1978

References

Further reading

 

Hydrophilidae
Articles created by Qbugbot
Beetles described in 1978